Edna Mills is an unincorporated community in Ross Township, Clinton County, Indiana.

History
A 1913 history of Clinton County describes Edna Mills as "a pleasant village" and offers the following origin of the town's name:
The name has been in use for over half a century, and the oldest inhabitants of the vicinity say that when it was first made a postoffice, a Mr. Kellenbarger, who owned a mill at that point, gave it the name of Edna in honor of his wife.  The location also used to be called facetiously "Blackberry".  The occasion for this was that a blacksmith named Michaels had a shop there and his favorite tipple was blackberry brandy, making "Blackberry" the notable feature of the locality.

A post office was established at Edna Mills in 1861, and remained in operation until it was discontinued in 1905.

Geography

References

External links

Unincorporated communities in Clinton County, Indiana
Unincorporated communities in Indiana